Mandi Assembly constituency is one of the 68 constituencies of the Himachal Pradesh Vidhan Sabha. This constituency is not reserved for the candidates belonging to Scheduled castes or Scheduled Tribes.

Overview
Mandi (constituency number 33) is one of the ten Vidhan Sabha constituencies located in Mandi district. It covers the entire Sadar Mandi tehsil. It is part of Mandi Lok Sabha constituency along with 18 other Assembly segments, namely, Bharmour, Lahaul & Spiti, Manali, Kullu, Banjar, Anni, Karsog, Sundernagar, Nachan, Seraj, Darang, Jogindernagar, Dharampur, Mandi, Balh, Sarkaghat, Rohru and Kinnaur.

Members of Legislative Assembly

Election Result

2022 
 

-->

See also
 List of constituencies of the Himachal Pradesh Legislative Assembly

References

External links
 

Mandi district
Assembly constituencies of Himachal Pradesh